The Canada 1941 census was a detailed enumeration of the Canadian population. The total population count was 11,506,655, representing a 10.9% increase over the 1931 census population count of 10,376,786. The 1941 census was the eighth comprehensive decennial census since Canadian Confederation on 1 July 1867. The previous census was the Northwest Provinces of Alberta, Saskatchewan, and Manitoba 1936 census and the following census was the Northwest Provinces of Alberta, Saskatchewan, and Manitoba 1946 census.

This census should become available to the public in 2033, 92 years after the census was collected.

Population by province 

For the second consecutive decade, British Columbia experienced the highest growth rate of the provinces, while Quebec added the largest number of new residents. Only Saskatchewan, reeling from the Great Depression and the Dust Bowl, experienced population decline.

References

1941 in Canada
1941
Canada